This article is a list of domestic and international non-governmental organizations (NGOs) operating in China.



List

0-9

A
Academy for Educational Development
ActionAid
Adventist Development and Relief Agency China
AFS Intercultural Exchanges
All Girls Allowed
American Bar Association
American Friends Service Committee
AmeriCares Foundation
ANESVAD (Acción Sanitaria y Desarollo Social)
Animals Asia Foundation
Australian Volunteers International

B
 Badi Foundation
 Bill and Melinda Gates Foundation
 Blacksmith Institute
 Blue Moon Fund
BN Vocational School
 Braille Without Borders
 Bremen Overseas Research and Development Association

C
Canadian Co-operative Association
Caritas Hong Kong
Chi Heng Foundation
Children in Crisis
China Care Foundation
China Foundation for Poverty Alleviation
China Youth Development Foundation
Christian Blind Mission International
Conservation International

D
DKT International

E
 European Union Chamber of Commerce in China

F
Family Health International
Fauna and Flora International
Forest Stewardship Council
Friedrich Ebert Stiftung
Friends of the Earth Hong Kong
Friends of Nature

G
Global Environmental Institute
Global Greengrants Fund
Golden Bridges
Good Food Fund
Greenpeace East Asia
Green Camel Bell
Guizhou Rural Tourism Development Center

H
Harvard Summit for Young Leaders in China
Habitat for Humanity International
Handicap International (Belgium)
Hanns-Seidel-Foundation
Health Unlimited
Heart to Heart Community Care
Heart to Heart International
Heifer Project International
Heinrich Böll Foundation
Helen Keller International (海伦凯勒国际基金会)
HelpAge International
Himalaya Foundation
Holt China Children's Services
Hong Kong AIDS Foundation
Hong Kong YMCA
Hope International

I
IFChina Original Studio
Institute of Contemporary Observation
Institute of International Education
Institute for Sustainable Communities
International Bridges to Justice
International Development Enterprises
International Fund for Animal Welfare
International Institute of Rural Reconstruction
International Republican Institute
Islamic Relief

J

K
Kadoorie Farm and Botanic Garden
Konrad Adenauer Stiftung
Korean Federation for Environmental Movement

L
Li Ka Shing Foundation
Lifeline Express
Lions Club

M
Marie Stopes International China Programme
Médecins du Monde
Médecins Sans Frontières
Mennonite Central Committee
Mercy Corps International
Muslim Hands

N
National Committee on US-China Relations
National Democratic Institute for International Affairs
National Endowment for Democracy
Natural Resources Defense Council
New Zealand China Friendship Society
NGO2.0

O
Operation Blessing
Operation Smile
Opportunity International
ORBIS International
OXFAM Hong Kong

P
Pacific Environment
Pacific Regional Environment Programme
People's Solidarity for Participatory Democracy
Plan International
Population Services International
Princeton-in-Asia
PATH
Project Hope
ProLiteracy Worldwide

R
Red Cross and Red Crescent Societies
International Federation
American
Australian
Hong Kong
Rockefeller Brothers Fund
Royal London Society for the Blind
Royal Society for Prevention of Cruelty to Animals

S
Save China's Tigers
Save the Children
Sea Turtles 911
Seva Foundation
Silence (龍耳)
Silver Lining Foundation
Singapore International Foundation
Shanghai Young Bakers
Smile Angel Foundation
Smile Train
SOS Kinderdorf
Special Olympics East Asia
Starr Foundation

T
The Library Project
Television Trust for the Environment
The Terma Foundation
The Asia Foundation
The Boys' and Girls' Clubs Association of Hong Kong
The Carter Center (CBM International)
The David and Lucile Packard Foundation
The Ford Foundation
The Fred Hollows Foundation
The Hong Kong Council of Social Service
The International HIV/AIDS Alliance
The Jane Goodall Institute (Roots & Shoots)
John D. and Catherine T. MacArthur Foundation
The Mountain Institute
The Nature Conservancy
The Salvation Army
The World Conservation Union (IUCN)
The Philip Hayden Foundation

U

V
Voluntary Service Overseas
Volunteers in Asia

W
Wetlands International - China Programme
WildAid
Wildlife Conservation Society
William J. Clinton Foundation
Wheelchair Foundation
Wokai
World Monuments Fund
World Vision International
World Wide Fund for Nature

X

Y
Yale-China Association
Youth For Understanding (YFU China)
Yunnan Institute of Development

Z
The Zigen Fund

See also
List of charities in the People's Republic of China

References

External links
China's NGO network - Ministry of Civil Affairs.
Chinese NGO Interactive Network

Articles and resources
China CSR Map
China Development Brief - News on social development and civil society in China
Database of over 200 International NGOs operating in China.
Database of NGOs operating in China. 
Report on China's Tax Rules For Not-For-Profit Organizations
The Guardian - International charities can play a vital role in helping extend the benefits of China's rapid development, by Ken Burnett
The World Bank and NGOs in China - In-depth Chinese NGO information by the World Bank
A Study of Chinese Philanthropy by Danqing Li

NGO China
China